Dysgonomonas macrotermitis  is a Gram-negative, facultatively anaerobic and non-motile bacterium from the genus of Dysgonomonas which has been isolated from the hindgut from the termite Macrotermes barneyi.

References

External links
Type strain of Dysgonomonas macrotermitis at BacDive -  the Bacterial Diversity Metadatabase

Bacteroidia
Bacteria described in 2014